Society for Science, formerly known as Science Service and later Society for Science and the Public, is a 501(c)(3) non-profit organization dedicated to the promotion of science, through its science education programs and publications, including the bi-weekly Science News magazine and the free-accessible online Science News Explores.

The organization has headquarters in Washington, D.C. It promotes the understanding and appreciation of science and the role it plays in human advancement. In pursuit of this goal, it publishes Science News and Science News Explores (formerly Science News for Students), and sponsors events including the International Science and Engineering Fair, the Regeneron Science Talent Search, and the Broadcom MASTERS (Math, Applied Science, Technology and Engineering for Rising Stars) competition.

History 

Society for Science was founded in 1921 by journalist Edward W. Scripps and zoologist William Emerson Ritter, under the name "Science Service", with the goal of informing the public of the latest scientific discoveries and achievements.  The Science Service emerged from a reorganization of a group that Scripps and Ritter had originally founded in 1919 as the American Society for the Dissemination of Science.

Scripps and Ritter accomplished their goal by distributing the latest science research to the public through a news service for reporters. In 1922, due to interest from non-journalists, Science Service started distributing Science News-Letter, which became a magazine in 1926. It quickly became a prime source of science news for libraries, schools, and individuals. In 1942, Science Service launched the first of its prestigious education competitions, the Westinghouse Science Talent Search.

In 2008, Science Service was renamed as the Society for Science & the Public (SSP), in order to better reflect the mission of the organization to advocate for science in the public interest.

Between the World Wars, Science Service sponsored Science Clubs of America, founded by Watson Davis. It was a national organization to popularize science among amateur scientists. High school science clubs were encouraged to join.

From 1940 through 1989, Science Service sponsored the Things of Science Club. Subscribers received a monthly box containing some kind or material or artifact, along with an pamphlet describing experiments that could be done with it. Sometimes the kits contained parts that could be assembled into a scientific instrument.

Beginning in 2003, it published Science News for Kids, an online magazine aimed at students, teachers and parents. This became Science News for Students. In 2022, with the publication of a new magazine of the same name, SNS was rebranded as Science News Explores.

In 2021, the organization announced it had shortened its name from Society for Science & the Public to Society for Science.

See also 
The Society for Science administers three international science competitions:
The Regeneron International Science and Engineering Fair, previously sponsored by Intel.
The Regeneron Science Talent Search, previously sponsored by Westinghouse and Intel.
The Broadcom MASTERS for middle school students.

References

External links
 Science News
 Science News Explores
 Science Service, now Society for Science.
 Society for Science: 100 Years of Impact
 Selected images from Science Service files at the Smithsonian Institution Archives

 
1921 establishments in the United States
501(c)(3) organizations
Educational organizations based in the United States
Non-profit organizations based in Washington, D.C.
Publishing companies of the United States
Publishing companies established in 1921
Science education in the United States
Scientific organizations established in 1921
Science advocacy organizations